Roberto Camardiel Escudero (29 November 1917, in Alagón, Zaragoza – 15 June 1989, in Zaragoza) was a Spanish theatre director and actor.

He appeared in Culpables and Bajo el cielo andaluz (1960), both directed by Arturo Ruiz-Castillo and starring  Marifé de Triana. In 1964 he got the Premio Nacional a la Mejor Interpretación Principal Masculina for his roles in Isidro Labrador, directed by Rafael J. Salvia, and Piedra de toque, directed by Julio Buchs, delivered by the minister D. José Solís Ruiz. He appeared in El Cristo del Océano (1971), directed by Tito Fernández, based on a book by Anatole France and starring Nino del Arco, Paolo Gozlino, José Suárez, Pilar Velázquez, Leonard Mann, Elio Marconato, José Manuel Martín, Ana Farra, Juan A. Elices, Goyo Lebrero, María Elena Arpón and Perla Cristal.

He died on 15 June 1989 from a bone disease at the age of 71. In October 2008 a park near Urbanización Kasan was named after him by the Consejo de Gobierno de Zaragoza.

Selected filmography

Persecución en Madrid (1952) – José Guillén
Todos somos necesarios (1956)
El hombre que viajaba despacito (1957) – Luciano
Los ángeles del volante (1957) – Policía
Mensajeros de Paz (1957) – Conserje del hotel
Un indiano en Moratilla (1958)
Aquellos tiempos del cuplé (1958) – Politico de la oposición
Una muchachita de Valladolid (1958) – Director Centro Gallego
The Nightingale in the Mountains (1958) – Peppino
A Luz Vem do Alto (1959) – Bernardo
Llegaron dos hombres (1959)
Molokai, la isla maldita (1959) – Bluck
La encrucijada (1960) – Max
Un ángel tuvo la culpa (1960) – Esustaquio Viñas
Nada menos que un arkángel (1960)
Culpables (1960) – Antonio
Bajo el cielo andaluz (1960) – Rafael Montoro
El hombre de la isla (1960)
La contessa azzurra (1960) – L'avvocato Gigliozzi
Ahí va otro recluta (1960) – Sargento
My Street (1960) – Marcelino
Ursus (1961) – Cleonte
La estatua (1961)
Aquí están las vicetiples (1961) – Txomin
The Colossus of Rhodes (1961) – Serse
La vida privada de Fulano de Tal (1961)
Pachín (1961)
Bello recuerdo (1961) – Ramon
Pachín almirante (1961)
Salto mortal (1962) – Leoncio
El hombre del expreso de Oriente (1962)
El último verano (1962) – Gordo (uncredited)
Teresa de Jesús (1962) – Blas, el Recuero
Tómbola (1962) – Batacazo, El Gordo
The Son of Captain Blood (1962) – Oliver Orguelthorpe
Bahía de Palma (1962)
Siempre en mi recuerdo (1962)
Jaguar (1963) – Juano
Perseo l'invincibile (1963) – Cefeo
Rocío from La Mancha (1963) – Rafael
Ensayo general para la muerte (1963) – Comisario Serge Dupont
Bochorno (1963) – Don Leandro
Piedra de toque (1963)
Juego de hombres (1963)
Isidro el labrador (1964) – Iván de Vargas
Aquella joven de blanco (1964) – Commissaire Jacomet
Coplan, agent secret FX 18 (1964) – Mazekia
Backfire (1964) – Stefanidès
Rueda de sospechosos (1964) – Inspector Paco Jiménez
El señor de La Salle (1964) – Nyel
Murieta (1965) – García 'Jack Tres Dedos'
The Vampire of Düsseldorf (1965) – Le régiseur de 'L'Eldorado' (uncredited)
Jesse James' Kid (1965) – Alonso
Whisky y vodka (1965) – Grisha Grisovich
Our Man in Jamaica (1965)
The Relentless Four (1965) – Jeffrey Anders
For a Few Dollars More (1965) – Tucumcari station clerk
Adiós gringo (1965) – Dr. Verne Barfield
The Two Parachutists (1965) – Gen. Jose Limar
La escalada de la muerte (1965) – El Mendigo
Platero y yo (1966) – Narbón
100.000 dollari per Lassiter (1966) – Pedro
¡Es mi hombre! (1966) – Don Tarsio
That Man George (1966)
Las últimas horas... (1966)
Missione sabbie roventi (1966)
Arizona Colt (1966) – Whiskey
La resa dei conti (1966) – Sheriff Jellicol
Up the MacGregors! (1967) – Pa Donovan
Adios, Hombre (1967) – Doc
Django Kill... If You Live, Shoot! (1967) – Sorrow
Left Handed Johnny West (1967) – Dusty
Les Têtes brûlées (1967) – Salvador
Escuela de enfermeras (1968) – (uncredited)
Train for Durango (1968) – Lobo
Between God, the Devil and a Winchester (1968) – Uncle Pink
The Sailor with Golden Fists (1968) – Tito Porro
Gatling Gun (1968) – Dr. Alan Curtis
El taxi de los conflictos (1969) – El tio de Catalina
Prisionero en la ciudad (1969) – Ambrosio
Quinto: non ammazzare (1969) – William, Tavern owner
Hamelín (1969) – Burgomaestre
Cuatro noches de boda (1969) – Don Laureano
El ángel (1969) – Inspector de policía
Susana (1969) – Emilio
Il trapianto (1970) – Don Liborio – il prete
La sfida dei MacKenna (1970) – Don Diego
Arizona Colt Returns (1970) – Double Whiskey
Mr. Superinvisible (1970) – Beithel
They Call Me Hallelujah (1971) – Gen. Emiliano Ramirez
El Cristo del Océano (1971) – Don José
Simón, contamos contigo (1971) – Don Teófilo
Me debes un muerto (1971) – Don Bernardo
Ben and Charlie (1972) – Sheriff of Silvertown (uncredited)
It Can Be Done Amigo (1972) – L'udriaco
La garbanza negra, que en paz descanse... (1972) – Monsieur Dupont
The Arizona Kid (1972) – Duffy
Return of Halleluja (1972) – Gen. Manuel Ramirez
Trop jolies pour être honnêtes (1972)
Dr. M schlägt zu (1972) – Carlos
El caserío (1972) – Manu
Uno, dos, tres... dispara otra vez (1973) – Fuzzy
Me has hecho perder el juicio (1973) – Moisés
Vacaciones sangrientas (1974)
Cuando el cuerno suena (1975)
The Possessed (1975) – Managing Editor
Bienvenido, Mister Krif (1975)
El extraño amor de los vampiros (1975) – Marcus
Solo ante el Streaking (1975) – Somontes
Sábado, chica, motel ¡qué lío aquel! (1976) – Pedro
Las delicias de los verdes años (1976) – D. Protasio
Mauricio, mon amour (1976) – Doctor Pereda
Guerreras verdes (1976) – Cabo Mariano
El calor de la llama (1976) – Pedro
Marcada por los hombres (1977) – Anselmo
Impossible Love (1977) – Sargento
Doña Perfecta (1977) – Tío Licurgo
Un hombre llamado Flor de Otoño (1978) – Armengol
Cabo de vara (1978)
La ciudad maldita (1978) – Sheriff Noonan
Venus de fuego (1978) – Cifuentes
La ocasión (1978) – Campesino
Tres mujeres de hoy (1980) – Padre de Maribel
Sus años dorados (1980) – El viejo
El lobo negro (1981)
Habibi, amor mío (1981)
La leyenda del tambor (1981) – Mosén Ramón
Cristóbal Colón, de oficio... descubridor (1982) – Califa
Nacional III (1982) – Tío Román
Juana la Loca... de vez en cuando (1983)
El Cid cabreador (1983) – Conde de Oviedo (final film role)

References

External links 
 
 

1917 births
1989 deaths
Male actors from Aragon
Spanish male film actors
Male Spaghetti Western actors
Deaths from skeletal disease